Peresopnytsia is a small village of Rivne Raion in the Rivne Oblast, Ukraine. It belongs to the Verkhivsk rural council and located on Stubly River, a tributary of Horyn River.

In 11th - 13th centuries it was one of two main cities of Horyn River basin. In the 12th century Peresopnytsia was a capital of the Peresopnytsia principality which was a regional principality of the Volhynian Principality. 

On 29 August 1561 in Peresopnytsia Monastery of the Blessed Virgin Nativity was finished work on creation of Peresopnytsia Gospel which is today known as the National relic of Ukraine.

Peresopnytsia princes
 1147-1149 Viacheslav I of Kiev
 1150-1150 Mstislav, son of Yuri Dolgorukiy
 1150-1151 Andrey Bogolyubsky as prince of Peresopnytsia and Turov
 1152-1154 Volodymyr, son of Andrei the Good
 1155-1156 Mstislav II of Kiev
 ...
 1180-1220 Mstislav the Mute, son of Yaroslav II of Kiev
 1225-1229 Vasilko Romanovich

References

External links
 Pryshchepa, B. Medieval Peresopnytsia in written and archaeological sources. Historical Volhynia portal

Villages in Rivne Raion